CITIC Resources Holdings Limited, a subsidiary of CITIC Group in China, is an integrated provider of natural resources (including petroleum, coal, metals) particularly petroleum business.

In 2007, CITIC Resources paid US$1.15 billion for oil fields in Kazakhstan and Northeast China from its parent company, CITIC Group. This accelerated CITIC Resources to transform from metal producer to oil producer. It expects to be the fourth largest oil producer in China, following Petrochina, Sinopec and CNOOC.

References

External links

Official website

Companies listed on the Hong Kong Stock Exchange
Companies established in 1997
CITIC Group
Government-owned companies of China
1997 establishments in China
Oil companies of China
Coal companies of China
Metal companies of China